Soetardjo Kartohadikusumo (22 October 1890 – 20 December 1976) was an Indonesian politician who served as the first Governor of West Java in 1945. A former member of the Volksraad, he was also renowned for the 1936 Soetardjo Petition.

Early life and education
Soetardjo was born on 22 October 1890 in the village of Kunduran, within what is today Blora Regency. He was the sixth of eight siblings. His father Kartoredjo was a district chief in Tuban. He began attending an Europeesche Lagere School (elementary school) at the age of 8, despite the age limit for such schools being 6; according to a book later published by the Ministry of Education and Culture, Kartohadikusumo "had to be made 2 years younger" to fit this age limit. He continued to study at a school for native bureaucrats in Magelang, during which he joined Budi Utomo and became chairman of its local office.

Career

After a one-month internship, he was appointed as an assistant scribe at the Rembang Residency office in 1911. He was later relocated to the regency office of Bojonegoro and later Blora, serving as assistant to the district (wedana) chiefs between 1913 and 1921. During this job, he attended the Government School (Bestuurschool) in Batavia between 1919 and 1921. By 1924, Soetardjo had been promoted to the district chief of Sambong in Blora, and by 1929 he was Vicegerent of Gresik.

In 1931, Soetardjo was appointed to the Volksraad, representing the native bureaucrats. At that time, he was chairman of the native bureaucrats' association (Persatuan Pegawai Bestuur Bumiputra). It was in this office that he made the 1936 Soetardjo Petition, which called for greater native autonomy in the Dutch East Indies. Soetardjo later cited the repression of left-wing political leaders following the De Zeven Provinciën mutiny in 1933, and the weakening of the native Indonesian Sultanate of Yogyakarta and Surakarta Sunanate as his motivations for the petition.

During the Japanese occupation of the Dutch East Indies, Soetardjo was appointed in 1943 as resident for the Jakarta area, and he was also appointed into the Investigating Committee for Preparatory Work for Independence (BPUPK). He also held a rank within the Defenders of the Homeland (PETA) militia. Further, in 1945, he also became a member of the Preparatory Committee for Indonesian Independence. Soetardjo was a proponent of the Greater Indonesia concept during his time at BPUPK.

After the proclamation of Indonesian independence, Soetardjo was appointed as the Republican governor of West Java on 6 September 1945. At that time, he was considered as the spokesman for the interests of the native bureaucracy, and he assured Sukarno and Mohammad Hatta of their support. His governorship was based in Jakarta, and following the city's occupation by Allied forces, the governorship was transferred to Mohammad Djamin. Aside from his governorship, he served as deputy chairman of the Central Indonesian National Committee, and was also chairman of the Indonesian Red Cross between 1946 and 1948.

He later joined the Provisional People's Representative Council after the conclusion of the revolution. Later, he was appointed to the Supreme Advisory Council, becoming its chairman. He died on 20 December 1976 in Jakarta.

References

1890 births
1976 deaths
Governors of West Java
Indonesian collaborators with Imperial Japan
Members of Pembela Tanah Air
Members of the People's Representative Council, 1950
People from Blora Regency